Ryan Redford is a Canadian film director and screenwriter, best known for his debut feature film Oliver Sherman. He was a Genie Award nominee for Best Adapted Screenplay at the 32nd Genie Awards.

Born in Vancouver, British Columbia, Redford studied film at York University. He wrote and directed several short films, including Murmur, The Unstrung Ear, Song of Wreckage and Lake, before working on Oliver Sherman.

References

External links

21st-century Canadian screenwriters
21st-century Canadian male writers
Canadian male screenwriters
Film directors from Vancouver
Writers from Vancouver
York University alumni
Living people
Year of birth missing (living people)